In Indian aesthetics, a rasa literally means "nectar, essence or taste". It connotes a concept in Indian arts about the aesthetic flavour of any visual, literary or musical work that evokes an emotion or feeling in the reader or audience but cannot be described. It refers to the emotional flavors/essence crafted into the work by the writer and relished by a 'sensitive spectator' or sahṛidaya, literally one who "has heart", and can connect to the work with emotion, without dryness.

Rasas are created by bhavas: the state of mind.

The rasa theory has a dedicated section (Chapter 6) in the Sanskrit text Natya Shastra, an ancient text on the arts from the 1st millennium BCE attributed to Bharata Muni. However, its most complete exposition in drama, songs and other performance arts is found in the works of the Kashmiri Shaivite philosopher Abhinavagupta (c. 1000 CE), demonstrating the persistence of a long-standing aesthetic tradition of ancient India. According to the Rasa theory of the Natya Shastra, entertainment is a desired effect of performance arts but not the primary goal, and the primary goal is to transport the audience into another parallel reality, full of wonder and bliss, where they experience the essence of their own consciousness, and reflect on spiritual and moral questions.

Although the concept of rasa is fundamental to many forms of Indian arts including dance, music, theatre, painting, sculpture, and literature, the interpretation and implementation of a particular rasa differs between different styles and schools. The Indian theory of rasa is also found in the Hindu arts and Ramayana musical productions in Bali and Java (Indonesia), but with regional creative evolution.

History
The word rasa appears in ancient Vedic literature. In Rigveda, it connotes a liquid, an extract and flavor. In Atharvaveda, rasa in many contexts means "taste", and also the sense of "the sap of grain". According to Daniel Meyer-Dinkgräfe – a professor of Drama, rasa in the Upanishads refers to the "essence, self-luminous consciousness, quintessence" but also "taste" in some contexts. In post-Vedic literature, the word generally connotes "extract, essence, juice or tasty liquid".

Rasa in an aesthetic sense is suggested in the Vedic literature, but the oldest surviving manuscripts, with the rasa theory of Hinduism, are of Natya Shastra. The Aitareya Brahmana in chapter 6, for example, states:

The Sanskrit text Natya shastra presents the rasa theory in Chapter 6, a text attributed to Bharata Muni. The text begins its discussion with a sutra called in Indian aesthetics as the rasa sutra:

According to the Natya shastra, the goals of theatre are to empower aesthetic experience and deliver emotional rasa. The text states that the aim of art is manifold. In many cases, it aims to produce repose and relief for those exhausted with labor, or distraught with grief, or laden with misery, or struck by austere times. Yet entertainment is an effect, but not the primary goal of arts according to Natya shastra. The primary goal is to create rasa so as to lift and transport the spectators, unto the expression of ultimate reality and transcendent values.

The Abhinavabhāratī is the most studied commentary on Natyasastra, written by Abhinavagupta (950–1020 CE), who referred to Natyasastra also as the Natyaveda. Abhinavagupta's analysis of Natyasastra is notable for its extensive discussion of aesthetic and ontological questions. According to Abhinavagupta, the success of an artistic performance is measured not by the reviews, awards or recognition the production receives, but only when it is performed with skilled precision, devoted faith and pure concentration such that the artist gets the audience emotionally absorbed into the art and immerses the spectator with pure joy of rasa experience.

Elements

Bharata Muni enunciated the eight Rasas in the Nātyasāstra, an ancient Sanskrit text of dramatic theory and other performance arts, written between 200 BC and 200 AD. In the Indian performing arts, a rasa is a sentiment or emotion evoked in each member of the audience by the art. The Natya Shastra mentions six rasa in one section, but in the dedicated section on rasa it states and discusses eight primary rasa. Each rasa, according to Nātyasāstra, has a presiding deity and a specific colour. There are 4 pairs of rasas. For instance, Hāsya arises out of Sringara. The Aura of a frightened person is black, and the aura of an angry person is red. Bharata Muni established the following:

 (शृङ्गारः):  Romance, Love, attractiveness. Presiding deity: Vishnu. Colour: light green
 (हास्यं):  Laughter, mirth, comedy. Presiding deity: Shiva. Colour: white
 (रौद्रं): Fury. Presiding deity: Shiva. Colour: red
 (कारुण्यं): Compassion, mercy. Presiding deity: Yama. Colour: grey
 (बीभत्सं): Disgust, aversion. Presiding deity: Shiva. Colour: blue
 (भयानकं): Horror, terror. Presiding deity: Yama. Colour: black
 (वीरं): Heroism. Presiding deity: Indra. Colour: saffron
 (अद्भुतं): Wonder, amazement. Presiding deity: Brahma. Colour: yellow

Śāntam rasa
A ninth rasa was added by later authors. This addition had to undergo a good deal of struggle between the sixth and the tenth centuries, before it could be accepted by the majority of the Alankarikas, and the expression "Navarasa" (the nine rasas), could come into vogue.

: Peace or tranquility. deity: Vishnu. Colour: perpetual white.

Shānta-rasa functions as an equal member of the set of rasas, but it is simultaneously distinct as being the most clear form of aesthetic bliss.  Abhinavagupta likens it to the string of a jeweled necklace; while it may not be the most appealing for most people, it is the string that gives form to the necklace, allowing the jewels of the other eight rasas to be relished.  Relishing the rasas and particularly shānta-rasa is hinted as being as-good-as but never-equal-to the bliss of Self-realization experienced by yogis.

List of bhavas 
According to the Natyashastra, bhavas are of three types: sthayi, sanchari, sattvika based on how they are developed or enacted during the aesthetic experience. This is seen in the following passage:
पुनश्च भावान्वक्ष्यामि स्थायिसञ्चारिसत्त्वजान्॥६.१६॥

Some bhavas are also described as being anubhava if they arise from some other bhAva.

Sthayee 
The Natyasastra lists eight Sthayibhavas with eight corresponding rasas: 
Rati (Love)
Hasya (Mirth)
Soka (शोक) (Sorrow)
Krodha (Anger)
Utsaha (Energy)
Bhaya (Terror)
Jugupsa (Disgust)
Vismaya (Astonishment)

This list is from the following passage:
रतिहासश्च शोकश्च क्रोधोत्साहौ भयं तथा।
जुगुप्सा विस्मयश्चेति स्थायिभावाः प्रकीर्तिताः॥६.१७॥

Sanchari
Sanchari Bhavas are those crossing feelings which are ancillary to a permanent mood. A list of 33 bhAvas are identified therein.

निर्वेदग्लानिशङ्काख्यास्तथासूया मदः श्रमः।
आलस्यं चैव दैन्यं च चिन्तामोहः स्मृतिर्धृतिः॥१८॥
व्रीडा चपलता हर्ष आवेगो जडता तथा।
गर्वो विषाद औत्सुक्यं निद्रापस्मार एव च॥१९॥
सुप्तं विबोधोऽमर्षश्चापि अवहित्थं अथोग्रता।
मतिर्व्याधिस्तथा उन्मादस्तथा मरणमेव च॥२०॥
त्रासश्चैव वितर्कश्च विज्ञेया व्यभिचारिणः।
त्रयस्त्रिंशदमी भावाः समाख्यातास्तु नामतः॥२१॥

Satvika
The Satvika-Bhavas themselves are listed below.
There are eight Satvika-Bhavas.
स्तम्भः स्वेदोऽथ रोमाञ्चः स्वरभेदोऽथ वेपथुः।
वैवर्ण्यं अश्रु-प्रलय इत्यष्टौ सात्विकाः स्मृताः॥२२॥

These are explained by Bharata and Dhanika as below:
"सत्त्वं नाम मनःप्रभवम्। एतदेव समाहितमनस्त्वादुत्पद्यते। " इति भरतः।
"एतदेवास्य सत्त्वं यत् दुःखितेन प्रहर्षितेन वा अश्रु-रोमाञ्चादयो निवर्त्यन्ते।
तेन सत्त्वेन  निर्वृत्ता भावाः - सात्त्विकाः भावाः। तद्भावभावनं च भावः।" इति धनिकः।
"पृथग् भावा भवन्त्यन्येऽनुभावत्वेऽपि सात्त्विकाः।
सत्त्वादेव समुत्पत्तेस्तच्च तद्भावभावनम्॥" इति धनिकः।

Thus, physical expression of the feelings of the mind are called Sattvika.

Role in art
According to Natya shastra, a rasa is a synthetic phenomenon and the goal of any creative performance art, oratory, painting or literature. Wallace Dace translates the ancient text's explanation of rasa as "a relish that of an elemental human emotion like love, pity, fear, heroism or mystery, which forms the dominant note of a dramatic piece; this dominant emotion, as tasted by the audience, has a different quality from that which is aroused in real life; rasa may be said to be the original emotion transfigured by aesthetic delight".

Rasas are created through a wide range of means, and the ancient Indian texts discuss many such means. For example, one way is through the use of gestures and facial expressions of the actors. Expressing Rasa in classical Indian dance form is referred to as Rasa-abhinaya.

The theory of rasas forms the aesthetic underpinning of all Indian classical dance and theatre, such as Bharatanatyam, Kathakali, Kathak, Kuchipudi, Odissi, Manipuri, Kudiyattam, and others.

In Indian classical music, each raga is an inspired creation for a specific mood, where the musician or ensemble creates the rasa in the listener. However, predominantly all ragas and musical performances in Hindu traditions aim at one of six rasa, wherein music is a form of painting "love, compassion, peace, heroism, comic or the feeling of wonder" within the listener. Anger, disgust, fear and such emotions are not the subject of rasa, but they are part of Indian theories on dramatic arts. Of the six rasa that are aimed at in Indian music, each has sub-categories. For example, love rasa in Hindu imagination has many musical flavors, such as erotic love (sringar) and spiritual devotional love (bhakti).

In the theories of Indian poetics, ancient scholars state that the effectiveness of a literary composition depends both on what is stated and how it is stated (words, grammar, rhythm), that is the suggested meaning and the experience of rasa. Among the most celebrated in Hindu traditions on the theory of poetics and literary works, are 5th-century Bhartrhari and the 9th-century Anandavardhana, but the theoretical tradition on integrating rasa into literary artworks likely goes back to a more ancient period. This is generally discussed under the Indian concepts of Dhvani, Sabdatattva and Sphota.

The literary work Bhagavata Purana deploys rasa, presenting Bhakti of Krishna in aesthetic terms. The rasa it presents is as an emotional relish, a mood, which is called Sthayi Bhava. This development towards a relishable state results by the interplay on it of attendant emotional conditions which are called Vibhavas, Anubhavas and Sanchari Bhavas. Vibhavas means Karana or cause: it is of two kinds - Alambana, the personal or human object and substratum, and Uddipana, the excitants. Anubhava, as the name signifies, means the ensuants or effects following the rise of the emotion. Sanchari Bhavas are those crossing feelings which are ancillary to a mood. Later scholars added more emotional states such as the Saatvika Bhavas.

In the Indian theories on sculpture and architecture (Shilpa Shastras), the rasa theories, in part, drive the forms, shapes, arrangements and expressions in images and structures. Some Indian texts on Shilpa on image carving and making, suggest nine rasas.

Influence on cinema
Rasa has been an important influence on the cinema of India. Satyajit Ray has applied the Rasa method of classical Sanskrit drama to movies, for instance in The Apu Trilogy (1955–1959).

In Hindi cinema, it is the theme of the film Naya Din Nayi Raat, where Sanjeev Kumar played nine characters corresponding to nine Rasa.

See also

 Abhinaya
 Natya Shastra
 Rasa lila
 Telugu literature
 Sanskrit Literature
 Sanskrit Theatre

Notes

References

Bibliography

External links
 Rasa (sentiments) in the Natya-shastra, Translated into English by Manomohan Ghosh
"Rasas" as Springs of Art in Indian Aesthetics, Radhakamal Mukerjee (Archive)
"Rasa" as Aesthetic Experience, G. B. Mohan Thampi (Archive)
The Theory of Rasa, P. J. Chaudhury
The Aesthetics of Ancient Indian Drama, V. Raghavan

Dance in India
Concepts in aesthetics
Literary theory
Sanskrit words and phrases